Maurice-Joseph Gevrey (13 March 1884 in Fauverney, Côte d'or, France – 19 September 1957 in Fauverney) was a French mathematician working on partial differential equations. 

From 1919, he worked at the University of Burgundy, becoming a professor there in 1920.

In 1918, he introduced what is now called Gevrey classes.

References

1884 births
1957 deaths
20th-century French mathematicians
PDE theorists